The Wave is a firm building artificial wave pools for surfing in England. The Wave: Bristol was opened in 2019, on the northern outskirts of the city. A second site, The Wave: London, is planned.

The Wave, Bristol 
The founder of the project is Nick Hounsfield. The project was named  "The Wave: Bristol" in 2012, initially focusing on a site next to the Portway in Bristol, but rejected it as not big enough. A  site on farmland at Easter Compton was selected in 2013, with the technology generating the artificial waves to be supplied by the Spanish company Wavegarden.

In August 2017, South Gloucestershire Council approved the £20 million scheme, which is designed for sustainability.  Besides the wave pool, the scheme will include a natural swimming lake, barefoot trails, foraging areas and gardens of various types - activity, sensory, healing, culinary and herb gardens. Other proposed features include a clubhouse, a surf shop, a ropes and tunnels course and a campsite.
The firm plans to host a High-Performance Surfing Centre and surf contests.

In June 2015, it was decided to use the American company Wave Loch's wave generation technology instead of Wavegarden's, requiring the opening date to be put back to 2016. 
However, as of May 2017, they reverted to the Wavegarden's technology.

In April 2016, The Wave announced that South Gloucestershire Council had approved the revised designs. With the switch back to Wavegarden, the planning permission was resubmitted, and approved in late August 2017.

In October 2019 construction was completed.

See also 
Surf Snowdonia

References

External links 

Water parks in the United Kingdom
Proposed buildings and structures in England
Sports venues in Gloucestershire
Tourist attractions in South Gloucestershire District